Arvind Kumar Sharma (born 25 November 1962) is an Indian dental surgeon, politician and a Member of Parliament in the 17th Lok Sabha from Rohtak. He represented the Karnal constituency of Haryana in 15th Lok Sabha and was a member of the Indian National Congress but he joined Bharatiya Janata Party in 2019.

Personal life
Sharma was born on 25 Nov 1962 to Pt. Satguru Dass Sharma and Bimla Devi in the village of M.P. Majra in Jhajjar district of Haryana. He completed his Bachelor of Dental Surgery from Gujarat University, Ahmedabad and Master of Dental Surgery from Maharshi Dayanand University, Rohtak. Sharma married Rita Sharma on 09 Nov 1989, with whom he has a son and a daughter. He is a medical practitioner, social worker and agriculturist.

Political career
In January 2014, he left Indian National Congress and joined Bahujan Samaj Party and was named chief ministerial candidate. He lost from both Yamunanagar and Julana seats and was pushed to the third slot in both the seats.

In 2019, he joined Bharatiya Janata Party and contested from Rohtak Lok Sabha seat in 2019 Indian general election and defeated Deepender Singh Hooda of Indian National Congress with margin of 7,503 votes.

References

External links
 Official biographical sketch in Parliament of India website

1963 births
 Living people
India MPs 1996–1997
India MPs 2004–2009
India MPs 2009–2014
India MPs 2019–present
 People from Jhajjar
 Lok Sabha members from Haryana
 Indian National Congress politicians from Haryana
 Bahujan Samaj Party politicians
 Bharatiya Janata Party politicians from Haryana